The Preparatory Committee for the Hong Kong Special Administrative Region was a body established by the People's Republic of China government on 26 January 1996 for the transition of the Hong Kong sovereignty in 1997.

The Preparatory Committee was responsible for implementation work related to the establishment of the HKSAR, including the prescription of the method for the formation of the first government and first Legislative Council and establishment of the Selection Committee, which in turn was responsible for the selection of the first chief executive and the members of the Provisional Legislative Council.

The Preparatory Committee consisted of 150 memberes with 94 Hong Kong appointees and 56 Mainland appointees. All the members of the Preliminary Working Committee were appointed to the Preparatory Committee.

The chairman of the committee was Qian Qichen. The two vice-chairmen from the mainland side were Lu Ping and Zhou Nan. The five vice-chairmen from the Hong Kong side were Henry Fok, T. K. Ann, Tung Chee-hwa, Simon Li and Leung Chun-ying.

See also
 Preliminary Working Committee
 Selection Committee
 Transfer of sovereignty over Hong Kong

References

.
British Hong Kong
Political history of Hong Kong
1996 in Hong Kong
1997 in Hong Kong
1996 in politics
1996 establishments in Hong Kong
1997 disestablishments in Hong Kong
1990s in Hong Kong
20th-century Chinese politicians
20th-century Hong Kong people